Omorgus granuliceps is a species of hide beetle in the subfamily Omorginae.

References

granuliceps
Beetles described in 1954